Club Sando Football Club or Club Sando is a women's football club in Trinidad and Tobago from San Fernando. Next to the women's team the club has a men's team.

History 

The club was founded in 1990 and in 1991 the first competitive men's team was established. The women's team was founded in 2014. In 2019 the club won the WoLF championship.

Current squad

References

External links
 Official Website of Club Sando FC

Women's football in Trinidad and Tobago
San Fernando, Trinidad and Tobago